Schloss Buchenau located in Buchenau between Fulda and Bad Hersfeld in the district of  Eiterfeld, federal state (Bundesland) of Hesse, Germany.

Buildings 
The castle was built in 1618 by Georg Melchior von Buchenau and his wife Agnes von Schwalbach in the style of Weser Renaissance.
There are 10 buildings around the castle and a small park.

History 
In 1680 the castle was sold by the Buchenau family to the Fürstabt of Fulda. He gave it to the family of Schenck zu Schweinsberg. The family came to Buchenau in 1694 and lived there until 1912. After that it was used as a boarding school until 1984.

Today 
In 2001 the castle became a conference and seminar centre. It offers accommodation for groups up to 120 persons.

Notes

External links
Schloss Buchenau

Houses completed in 1618
Castles in Hesse
Landmarks in Germany
Buildings and structures in Fulda (district)
1618 establishments in the Holy Roman Empire